Nitor helmsianus is a species of small air-breathing land snail, a terrestrial pulmonate gastropod mollusk in the family Helicarionidae. This species is endemic to Australia. It grows to about 12 mm in diameter.

References

Helicarionidae
Gastropods described in 1941
Gastropods of Australia